Venice Medical is a 1983 American television film. It was directed by Hy Averback.

Cast
Carol Arthur as Mrs. Baker
Michael Brandon as Dr. Pete Marcus
David Faustino as Terry Marcus
Ramón Franco as Jorge
Rick Garcia as Officer Montoya
Elaine Giftos as Gwen Marcus
Clara Perryman as Dr. Becky Warfield
Rebecca Holden as Tawney

References

External links
Venice Medical at IMDb
Venice Medical at BFI

1983 television films
1983 films
Films directed by Hy Averback